So In Love is the debut studio album by American jazz pianist Andrew Hill, recorded in 1959 and released by Warwick Records in 1960.

Track listing
So In Love
Chiconga
Body and Soul
Old Devil Moon
Spring Is Here
Penthouse Party
That's All

Personnel
Andrew Hill - piano
Malachi Favors - bass
James Slaughter - drums

References

1960 debut albums
Andrew Hill albums
Hard bop albums
Warwick Records (United States) albums
Albums produced by Fred Mendelsohn